Zameer Ahmed Khan (b. 1 August) is an Indian politician. BZ Zameer Ahmed Khan is a 4 time MLA of Chamrajpet Constituency and managing partner of National Travels.

Early life 

National Travels was founded by BP Basheer Ahmed Khan. After his death in the early 1950s, his eldest son B Ataulla Khan took charge of the company followed by his brothers namely: B Ziaulla, B Sanaulla, B Anwarulla, B Rahmathulla, B Noorulla, and B Sirajulla. They were in turn succeeded by a third generation, led by B Ataulla Khan and brothers.

Career 
He is a member of the Legislative Assembly, Cabinet Minister Govt. Of Karnataka and former General Secretary of the Karnataka Pradesh Janata Dal (Secular). Khan was the former Minister for the Hajj and Wakf Board for government of Karnataka.

In 2005, S. M. Krishna was appointed Maharashtra governor, which paved the way for Zameer's political growth. When Krishna vacated Chamarajpet's seat to take up the governor's post, JD(S) fielded Zameer who beat Krishna's lieutenant R. V. Devraj. Subsequently, Zameer was sworn in as Haj and wakf minister in the JDS-BJP coalition government under H D Kumaraswamy.
On 25 March 2018, Zameer along with 6 other MLA's of the JD(S) party officially joined Indian National Congress.

References 

Karnataka MLAs 2008–2013
Living people
Indian National Congress politicians from Karnataka
1966 births